Teen Musical Theater of Oregon (TMTO) is a youth theater program in Medford, Oregon, USA, produced by Craterian Performances.

Description
Teen Musical Theater of Oregon includes kids age 13 - 19 but will sometimes add children age 9 - 12, known as Children's Musical Theater of Oregon, depending on the show. Along with children and teens of this age, Teen Musical Theater will sometimes add "Guest Stars" to the shows who take on roles such as Daddy Warbucks in Annie and The Man In Chair from The Drowsy Chaperone. TMTO will generally put on three productions a year - a spring show, a summer show, and a winter show. TMTO will occasionally produce concerts with a smaller, selected cast.

History

Teen Musical Theater began back in 2006 with a spring production of Grease. At that time the production was called Children's Musical Theater of Ashland (CMTA) until it was later renamed Children's Musical Theater of Oregon (CMTO). The company was founded by composer and keyboardist John Taylor and his wife Rhonda Taylor. His inspiration to found this organization came from the impact John P. Healy Jr. had on him when he was a part of San Jose Children's Musical Theater. Shortly after the 2008 summer production of Oklahoma!, Children's Musical Theater of Oregon was adopted by Craterian Performances. During the spring 2010 performance of Will Rogers Follies, a new branch of Children's Musical Theater of Oregon was created, called Teen Musical Theater of Oregon. While CMTO is still a working entity of the organization, it has taken a back seat allowing TMTO to produce the majority of the Musical Theater of Oregon's productions.

Original productions
The company has made three original productions: Broadway: A Musical Journey, Broadway II: The Journey Continues, and Moving On: TMTO in Concert. The first two being revues of many Broadway songs from many different Broadway shows including Lion King, Damn Yankees, A Chorus Line, The Color Purple and Hairspray. The Broadway series was created as a collaboration between John Taylor and David McCandless. Moving On was created and directed by Cailey McCandless and was a sendoff concert for eight graduating seniors who had participated in TMTO for years.

List of Full Productions
 
2006 Season
 Grease
 The Wizard of Oz
2007 Season
 High School Musical
 Peter Pan
2008 Season
 Broadway: A Musical Journey
 Oklahoma!
2009 Season
 Broadway 2: The Journey Continues
 Once On This Island
2010 Season
 The Will Rogers Follies
 Seussical The Musical
2011 Season
 Hello, Dolly!
 Joseph and the Amazing Technicolor Dreamcoat
 You're A Good Man Charlie Brown
2012 Season
 Pippin
 The Music Man
 Miracle on 34th Street
2013 Season
 The Drowsy Chaperone
 Tarzan
 Moving On: TMTO in Concert
 Annie
2014 Season
 Thoroughly Modern Millie
 Shrek the Musical
 A Christmas Carol
2015 Season
 Bye Bye Birdie
 Peter Pan
 White Christmas
2016 Season
 How to Succeed in Business Without Really Trying
 The Little Mermaid
 The Addams Family
2017 Season
 The Will Rogers Follies
 The Lion King, Jr.
 Hairspray
 Seussical The Musical
2018 Season
 Once Upon a Mattress
 Aladdin, Jr.
 Joseph and the Amazing Technicolor Dreamcoat
 Willy Wonka 
2019 Season
 Newsies
 Freaky Friday, the musical
 Pinocchio Jr.
 Howlin' Halloween
 Frozen Jr.

2020 Season
 Children of Eden
 The Twelve Days of Christmas Countdown

2021
 Into the Woods
 High School Musical 
 The Twelve Days of Christmas Countdown

2022
 Drowsy Chaperone
 Beauty and the Beast
 Cinderella

2023
 Shrek

References

Medford, Oregon
2005 establishments in Oregon
Theatre companies in Oregon
Children's theatre
Arts organizations established in 2005